Tatarchev is a Bulgarian masculine surname – its feminine counterpart being Tatarcheva (Татарчева) – and may refer to:
Hristo Tatarchev (1869–1952), Bulgarian revolutionary
Ivan Tatarchev (1930–2008), Bulgarian jurist and lawyer

Bulgarian-language surnames